Salix sericea, commonly known as silky willow, is a shrub in the Salicaceae family that grows in swamps and along rivers in eastern United States and Canada.
The leaves are 6–10 cm long, 7–8 mm wide, lanceolate, acuminate, serrulate, dark green and lightly hairy on top, and light green and densely covered with white silky hairs underneath. Mature leaves are glabrous. The petioles are 1 cm long. Catkins are sessile and usually bracteate. S. sericea blooms in May and fruits in June.

References

sericea
Trees of the Southeastern United States